A Kylie Christmas is a series of Christmas concerts performed by Australian singer-songwriter Kylie Minogue at the Royal Albert Hall in London, in support of her thirteenth studio album Kylie Christmas (2015). In 2015, the show was held on 11 December, and two dates were held on 9 December 2016 and 10 December 2016. Minogue performed mainly songs from her album Kylie Christmas and its reissue, but included some of her previous hits.

Set list
 
2015 show
 "Overture" 
 "It's the Most Wonderful Time of the Year"
 "I'm Gonna Be Warm This Winter"
 "Santa Claus Is Coming to Town"
 "Oh Santa"
 "Christmas Wrapping"
 "Wow"
 "Winter Wonderland"
 "Every Day's Like Christmas"
 "Can't Get You Out of My Head"
 "2000 Miles" 
 "Christmas Isn't Christmas 'Til You Get Here"
 "On a Night Like This"
 "100 Degrees" 
 "Spinning Around"
 "Your Disco Needs You"
 "Santa Baby"
 "Let It Snow"
 "The Twelve Days of Christmas" 
 "The Loco-Motion" 
 "White Diamond Theme" 
 "I Believe in You" 
 "Only You"
 "Love at First Sight"
 "All the Lovers"
 "Celebration"
 "Especially for You"
 "I Wish It Could Be Christmas Everyday"

2016 shows
 "Overture" 
 "It's the Most Wonderful Time of the Year"
 "Wonderful Christmastime"
 "Santa Claus Is Coming to Town"
 "Christmas Wrapping"
 "At Christmas"
 "Come into My World"
 "Confide in Me" (with John Grant)
 "The One"
 "Better the Devil You Know" (with Olly Alexander)
 "Celebration"
 "Stay Another Day"
 "Your Disco Needs You" (with Katherine Jenkins)
 "100 Degrees"
 "Spinning Around"
 "Christmas Lights"
 "The Locomotion" (Showgirl version)
 "Let It Snow"
 "Santa Baby"
 "Can't Get You Out of My Head"
 "Night Fever"
 "Everybody's Free (To Feel Good)"
 "Love at First Sight"
 "All the Lovers"
 "Silent Night"
 "Especially For You"
 "I Wish It Could Be Christmas Everyday"

Show dates

A Kylie Christmas – Live from the Royal Albert Hall 2015

A Kylie Christmas – Live from the Royal Albert Hall 2015 is the 12th concert film released by Australian artist Kylie Minogue. Featuring its corresponding tour, the concert was filmed at Royal Albert Hall in London, while the programme was commissioned by Sky Arts and directed by Paul Dugdale.

The television special was first broadcast on Sky Arts on 17 December 2015 and was then shown on Sky One on Christmas Day. The film was released via iTunes and Apple Music on 25 November 2016 to coincide with the release of Kylie Christmas: Snow Queen Edition.

Track listing

Notes

References

Kylie Minogue concert tours
2015 in Australian music
2016 in Australian music
Kylie Christmas
Kylie Christmas
Christmas concerts
Concerts at the Royal Albert Hall
Kylie Christmas
Kylie Christmas